The Terrible People is a 1960 West German crime film directed by Harald Reinl and starring Joachim Fuchsberger, Karin Dor and Fritz Rasp. It is based on Edgar Wallace's 1926 novel of the same name.

It was shot at the Bendestorf Studios near Hamburg with location shooting at Tremsbüttel Castle in Schleswig-Holstein. The film's sets were designed by the art director Erik Aaes.

Cast

Production
The film is based on Edgar Wallace's 1926 novel of the same name. Cinematography took place in London between June to 23 July 1960.

Release
The FSK gave the film a rating of 16 and up and found it not appropriate for screenings on public holidays.

See also
The Terrible People (1928, film serial)

References

External links

1960s mystery thriller films
German mystery thriller films
West German films
Films directed by Harald Reinl
Films based on British novels
Films based on works by Edgar Wallace
Films set in London
German black-and-white films
Remakes of American films
Constantin Film films
1960s German-language films
1960s German films